The year 2010 is the third year in the history of Ultimate Challenge MMA, a mixed martial arts promotion based in the United Kingdom. In 2010 Ultimate Challenge MMA held 8 events beginning with, CMMA 10: Resurrection.

Events list

UCMMA 10: Resurrection

UCMMA 10: Resurrection was an event held on February 6, 2010 at the Troxy in London, England, United Kingdom.

Results

UCMMA 11: Adrenaline Rush

UCMMA 11: Adrenaline Rush was an event held on March 27, 2010 at the Troxy in London, England, United Kingdom.

Results

UCMMA 12: Never Back Down

UCMMA 12: Never Back Down was an event held on June 8, 2010 at the Troxy in London, England, United Kingdom.

Results

UCMMA 13: Feel the Pain

UCMMA 13: Feel the Pain was an event held on July 20, 2010 at the Troxy in London, England, United Kingdom.

Results

UCMMA 14: Invincible

UCMMA 14: Invincible was an event held on August 7, 2010 at the Troxy in London, England, United Kingdom.

Results

UCMMA 15: Showdown

UCMMA 15: Showdown was an event held on September 18, 2010 at the Troxy in London, England, United Kingdom.

Results

UCMMA 16: Unbelievable

UCMMA 16: Unbelievable was an event held on October 22, 2010 at the Troxy in London, England, United Kingdom.

Results

UCMMA 17: Kings of the Cage

UCMMA 17: Kings of the Cage was an event held on December 3, 2010 at the Troxy in London, England, United Kingdom.

Results

See also 
 Ultimate Challenge MMA

References

Ultimate Challenge MMA events
2010 in mixed martial arts